Independence Day Award, Bangladesh's highest civilian honours - Winners, 1977-1979:

1977

1978

1979

References

Civil awards and decorations of Bangladesh